Les Ancizes-Comps is a commune in the Puy-de-Dôme department in Auvergne-Rhône-Alpes in central France.

Administration 
 2008–2014: Pascal Estier
 2014–current (as of June 2022): Didier Manuby

Population

See also
 Fades viaduct
 Communes of the Puy-de-Dôme department

References

Communes of Puy-de-Dôme
Auvergne